Disassociated Press, or The Disassociated Press, is a common spoof on The Associated Press used by satirists to depict a fictitious news organization. It has been used throughout the years in entertainment and literature in a variety of vehicles, ranging from Looney Tunes cartoons from the 1950s through to modern Internet satiric web pages and web sites using that title.

See also
 List of satirical news websites

External links
 The Disassociated Press

Parodies
Associated Press